The women's 7.5 km sprint competition of the 2015 Winter Universiade was held at the National Biathlon Centre in Osrblie on January 27.

Results

References 

Women's 07.5km
2015 in Slovak women's sport